Samet Bulut (born 25 February 1996) is a Dutch footballer of Turkish descent who plays as a forward for Turkish TFF Third League club Alanya Kestelspor.

Personal life
On 12 March 2015, when Bulut played in the youth academy of Ajax, he was arrested along with teammates Zakaria El Azzouzi and Aschraf El Mahdioui for assaulting a plainclothed policewoman. The officer suffered shoulder injuries and various bruises. She later filed charges against the three players. A day later, Ajax announced in an official message that they had suspended the players. Later that week, El Azzouzi remained the only suspect in the case. Bulut was allowed to make appearances for the Ajax A1 youth side again after serving a month suspension. As punishment, he had to inform the youth players of Ajax together with El Azzouzi and El Mahdioui.

References

External links

1996 births
Footballers from Amsterdam
Dutch people of Turkish descent
Living people
Dutch footballers
Association football forwards
AFC Ajax players
PEC Zwolle players
Almere City FC players
1922 Konyaspor footballers
TOP Oss players
Eredivisie players
Eerste Divisie players
Derde Divisie players
TFF Second League players
TFF Third League players
Dutch expatriate footballers
Expatriate footballers in Turkey
Dutch expatriate sportspeople in Turkey